Zirenj (also Romanized as Zīrenj and Zirinj; also known as Zerīnj and Zirach) is a village in Mahyar Rural District, in the Central District of Qaen County, South Khorasan Province, Iran. At the 2006 census, its population was 58, in 15 families.

References 

Populated places in Qaen County